Joseph D. Morelle (born April 29, 1957) is an American politician serving as the U.S. representative for New York's 25th congressional district since 2018. A Democrat, he was formerly a member of the New York State Assembly representing the 136th Assembly district, which includes eastern portions of the City of Rochester and the Monroe County suburbs of Irondequoit and Brighton. Speaker Sheldon Silver appointed him as majority leader of the New York State Assembly in January 2013 and Morelle served as acting speaker in the Speaker's absence. He was elected to the United States House of Representatives for New York's 25th congressional district in November 2018 following the death of longtime Representative Louise Slaughter.

Early life and education
Morelle was born in Utica, New York, to Gilbert and Juliette Morelle. Gil was a Korean War veteran, a heating and cooling technician and a lifelong Plumbers and Pipefitters Union member. Joe and his three siblings grew up Catholic, on Vayo Street in Irondequoit, where he attended Eastridge High School. He received a bachelor's degree in political science from SUNY Geneseo in 1986.

In his early years, Morelle was a sales manager for a drycleaning and laundry business. He got his political start working for State Senator John D. Perry as a constituent services representative in Rochester and legislative aide in Albany.

Political career

County legislature
Morelle, a Democrat, made his first foray into elective politics at age 24 when he ran for a seat in the Monroe County legislature. He failed to unseat the incumbent on the first try, but prevailed in the 1983 election. He was reelected once before running for the New York State legislature.

State legislature

Morelle was first elected to the State Assembly in 1990. He ran uncontested in the November 2008 general election and won the November 2010 general election with 61% of the vote.

During his tenure in the state legislature, Morelle authored more than 200 laws, including major reforms to the workers compensation system, laws to require carbon monoxide detectors in one- and two-family homes, toughen regulations governing charitable organizations, protect the elderly and infirm who live in nursing homes or receive home based health care, and raise senior citizens' real property tax exemption. He sponsored bills to exempt veterans from certain state licensing fees, protect their grave sites, and assist them with the civil service application process.

In January 2001, Morelle was appointed chair of the Assembly Standing Committee on Tourism, Arts, and Sports Development. He worked with area leaders to develop Rochester as a center for tourism and the arts in Western New York.

In addition to the Tourism Committee, Morelle's standing committee assignments included Economic Development, Job Creation, Commerce and Industry; Higher Education; Local Governments; and Libraries and Education Technology. At his request, the Speaker created the Subcommittee on Manufacturing in order to give New York's manufacturing sector a greater voice in state government.

In 2005, Morelle issued a report, "Creating a State of Innovation: Unleashing The Power of New York's Entrepreneurial Economy", detailing New York's economic decline, particularly upstate, and offering numerous policy recommendations to reverse this years-long trend.

In 2005, Morelle was elected chair of the Monroe County Democratic Committee, and held this position until 2014.

Campaign violations
In 1990, an acting state Supreme Court justice ruled that Morelle fraudulently obtained several signatures on nominating petitions to qualify him for an independent line on the 1990 ballot (New York permits cross-filing in some circumstances) during his run for the State Assembly. Morelle remained on the ballot and won the election.  He later admitted that he allowed family members to sign the petitions for the individuals whose names appeared on them and did not personally witness the signatures, both of which are illegal. In 1991 he was charged with seven misdemeanor counts of violating state election law. Morelle denied intentionally violating the law, but accepted a plea bargain in which he was found guilty of two counts of disorderly conduct. He was sentenced to 32 hours of community service and a $25 fine. Because disorderly conduct is a violation of the law, rather than a misdemeanor or felony, Morelle's plea enabled him to avoid having a permanent criminal record as a result of the incident.

U.S. House of Representatives

Elections

2018 

After the death of Representative Louise Slaughter, Morelle announced his candidacy for New York's 25th congressional district; he won the Democratic Party's nomination on June 26, 2018. On November 6, he ran in two elections: a special election for the last two months of Slaughter's 16th term, and a regular election for a full two-year term. He won both, defeating Republican nominee Jim Maxwell.

2020 

Morelle ran for reelection to a second full term, winning the Democratic primary against challenger and Brighton town councilwoman Robin Wilt. He defeated the Republican nominee, businessman George Mitris, in the general election.

Tenure
Morelle was sworn in on November 13, 2018.

Committee assignments 
Committee on Armed Services
Committee on Rules
Committee on the Budget
Committee on Education and Labor
Subcommittee on Early Childhood, Elementary and Secondary Education
Subcommittee on Health, Employment, Labor, and Pensions

Caucus memberships 
New Democrat Coalition

Electoral history

Personal life
Morelle lives in Irondequoit with his wife, Mary Beth. They have three children.

References

External links

Congressman Morelle official U.S. House website
Campaign website

 

|-

|-

|-

|-

|-

1957 births
2012 United States presidential electors
21st-century American politicians
Democratic Party members of the United States House of Representatives from New York (state)
Living people
Democratic Party members of the New York State Assembly
Politicians from Rochester, New York
State University of New York at Geneseo alumni